William Bayard (21 August 1814 – 17 December 1907) was a distinguished physician in New Brunswick. He was the son of Dr. Robert Bayard, also a noted physician and author.

Bayard was born in Kentville, Nova Scotia, and received his medical training in New York State and at the University of Edinburgh. He received his MD in 1837. He then practiced medicine with his father, Robert Bayard, in Saint John, New Brunswick and continued the practice after his father's death. He was the coroner of that city for 30 years.

References 

1814 births
1907 deaths
19th-century Canadian physicians
Canadian people of American descent
Canadian people of Dutch descent
Canadian people of Scottish descent
William
Livingston family
Schuyler family
Canadian coroners
People from Kentville, Nova Scotia